Croatian Argentines are Argentine citizens of Croatian descent or Croatian-born people who reside in Argentina. Croats and their descendants settled in Buenos Aires, the homonymous province, Santa Fe, Córdoba, Chaco, and Patagonia. Argentines of Croatian descent number over 250,000.

History

At the turn of the 19th and 20th centuries there were 133 settlements, with some 120,000 Croats in Argentina, for the most part hailing from the coastal regions of Dalmatia and the Croatian Littoral, who were among the first European immigrants to settle in the Argentine pampas. The pioneers from the island of Hvar were followed by emigrants from other parts of Dalmatia and the other historic Croatian lands, mostly present-day Croatia.

The most financially successful of all the Croats in Argentina was also almost the first to arrive: Nikola Mihanović came to Montevideo, Uruguay in 1867, and, having settled in Buenos Aires, Mihanović owned 350 vessels of one kind or another by 1909, including 82 steamers. By 1918, he employed 5,000 people, mostly from his native Dalmatia. Mihanović by himself was thus a major factor in building up a Croat community that remains primarily Dalmatian to this day.

The second wave of Croat immigration was far more numerous, totaling 15,000 by 1939. Mostly peasants, these immigrants fanned out to work the land in Buenos Aires Province, Santa Fe, Chaco, and Patagonia. This wave was accompanied by numerous clergy to attend their spiritual needs, especially Franciscans.

If the first two waves had been primarily economic, the third wave after World War II was eminently political. Some 20,000 Croatian political refugees came to Argentina, and most became construction workers on Peron's public works projects until they started to pick up some Spanish. Argentina today has the third-largest number of Croatian descendants in the world.

Notable Croatian Argentines
 Alejandro Spajić – Volleyball player
 Alicia Kirchner Ostoić – Politician
 Mateo Bajamich – Football player
 Daniel Bilos – Football player
 Daniel Orsanic – Tennis player
 Darío Cvitanich – Football player
 Diego Maradona  – Football player. His maternal grandmother, Salvadora Kariolic, was of Croatian origin.
 Davor Ivo Stier – Croatian Democratic Union politician
 Antonio Mohamed Matijevich – Football player 
 El Trinche - Football player. Both of his parents were of Croatian descent.
 Emilio Ogñénovich – Bishop of the Roman Catholic Church
 Estanislao Esteban Karlic – Cardinal of the Roman Catholic Church
 Fernando Siro – Born Francisco Luksich, actor and director
 Iván Gabrich – Football player
 Javier Frana – Tennis player
 José María Buljubasich – Football player
 Juan Vucetich – Anthropologist and police official who pioneered the use of fingerprinting
 Juan Yustrich –  Football goalkeeper
 Leonardo Pisculichi – Football player
 Lita Stantic – Filmmaker
 Ljerko Spiller – Violinist
 Marcos Milinkovic – Volleyball player
 Martin Šarić – Football player
 Nicolás Mihanovich – Shipping magnate
 Nicolás Pavlovich – Football player
 Néstor Kirchner – Former President of Argentina
 Juan Pablo Krilanovich – Football player
 Pablo Vranjicán – Football player
 Sandra Mihanovich – Singer/songwriter
 Sebastián Crismanich – Taekwondo athlete
 Federico Grabich – Swimmer
 Maximiliano Stanic – Basketball player
 Drago Pilsel – Civil rights activist
 Mario Markic – Journalist and writer
 Ramón Miérez  – Football player. His mother is of Croatian origin.

See also
 Argentina–Croatia relations
 Croats
 List of Croats

References

External links
 Croats in Argentina

Argentina
European Argentine
Immigration to Argentina